Julian Keith Getty OBE (born 16 December 1974) is a Northern Irish Christian singer and songwriter, best known for writing the modern hymn "In Christ Alone" in 2001 with veteran songwriter and worship leader Stuart Townend. Getty and his wife Kristyn also release music under the musical duo Keith & Kristyn Getty

Early life 
Getty was born in Lisburn, Northern Ireland, to Helen Getty (née Irwin) and John Getty. He is the eldest of four children.

Getty began making music at age 11, learning to play the classical guitar; at 12 years old he began playing the flute. During school, Getty was influenced by classical music, Irish music, and church music of all kinds. As a young adult, he studied music at St Chad's College, Durham University, graduating with his Bachelor of Arts in 1995. As a student, Getty completed special conducting opportunities at the Canford Summer School of Music and the Tanglewood Music Center in Massachusetts. Getty participated in a summer master class under Irish flautist Sir James Galway.

Personal life 
Kristyn met Keith Getty in 2002 after being introduced by Kristyn's uncle, John Lennox. Kristyn was attending a nearby university and asked Getty for some musical advice. After dating for two years, the couple married on 16 June 2004. The couple have four children.

Getty and his wife live between Portstewart, Northern Ireland and Nashville, Tennessee with their four daughters.

Career

Keith and Kristyn Getty 

Keith and his wife Kristyn write and release hymns together.

Children's albums 
Keith and Kristyn together have written and produced a number of children's worship albums.

 2005: Songs That Jesus Said, a collection of songs for children
 2016: Getty Kids Hymnal: In Christ Alone
 2017: Getty Kids Hymnal: For the Cause
 2018: Getty Kids Hymnal: Family Hymn Sing
 2019: Getty Kids Hymnal: Family Carol Sing
 2020: Evensong: Hymns and Lullabies at the Close of Day

Evensong: Hymns and Lullabies at the Close of Day went to Billboard number 1 in 2020.

Orchestrator 
In addition to his work with his wife as Keith & Kristyn Getty, Getty has also orchestrated or produced music for a number of other projects. These include orchestrations for Michael W. Smith's 2004 Healing Rain album, McDonald's television commercials, and Silvascreen label movie soundtrack recordings Music from the Lord of the Rings Trilogy and Once upon a Time: The Essential Ennio Morricone.  He wrote and produced the music for the 1998 C. S. Lewis International Centenary Celebrations.

"In Christ Alone" song 

In 2001, Getty and Stuart Townend wrote the song "In Christ Alone" with the purpose of creating a modern hymn that would explain the life of Christ. They released it on the Kingsway album New Irish Hymns, featuring vocalists  Máire Brennan, Margaret Becker, and Joanne Hogg. The song gained popularity, and by 2005 it was named by a BBC Songs of Praise survey as the ninth best loved hymn of all time, and in their 2010 survey was named second best hymn of all time. The British Hymn Society nominated "In Christ Alone" as one of the top five hymns of all time, and BBC One's "Songs of Praise" nominated "In Christ Alone" as a top 10 hymn in 2012.

Recognition 
Keith Getty received the O.B.E. Officer of the Order of the British Empire (OBE) from Queen Elizabeth II.

Getty has received honorary doctorates from Lancaster Bible College and Dallas Baptist University.

In 2017, the hymn writers performed for US Vice-President Mike Pence and his wife Second Lady Karen Pence at the Vice-President's residence. In addition the couple have performed for President George W Bush, the United Nations, South Korean President Lee Myung-Bak, the Enthronement of the Archbishop of Canterbury and for former UK Prime Minister Theresa May.

Discography 
•           2002: Tapestry Keith Getty and Kristyn Lennox (Getty)

•           2003: New Irish Hymns 2 (with Margaret Becker and Joanne Hogg)

•           2004: New Irish Hymns 3: Incarnation (with Margaret Becker and Joanne Hogg)

•           2005: New Irish Hymns 4 (with Margaret Becker and Joanne Hogg)

•           2005: Songs That Jesus Said; a collection of songs for children

•           2006: The Apostles' Creed

•           2006: Modern Hymns Live

•           2007: In Christ Alone with Keith Getty

•           2008: Prom Praise featured guest with the All Souls Orchestra; recorded live at Royal Albert Hall

•           2008: Keswick Live with Keith Getty, Stuart Townend, and Steve James, recorded at the Keswick Convention

•           2009: Awaken the Dawn with Keith Getty

•           2011: Joy—An Irish Christmas with Keith Getty

•           2012: Hymns for the Christian Life with Keith Getty

•           2013: Modern and Traditional Hymns: Live at the Gospel Coalition with Keith Getty

•           2016: Facing a Task Unfinished with Keith Getty

•           2016: Getty Kids Hymnal: In Christ Alone

•           2017: Getty Kids Hymnal: For the Cause

•           2017:  Sing! Live from the Getty Music Worship Conference

•           2018: Psalms Ancient and Modern:  Live from the Getty Music Worship Conference

•           2018: The North Coast Sessions

•           2018: Getty Kids Hymnal: Family Hymn Sing

•           2019: His Mercy Is More - The Hymns of Matt Boswell and Matt Papa

•           2019: Getty Kids Hymnal: Family Carol Sing

•           2019/2020:  Quintology:  Sing! The Life of Christ

•           2020: Evensong: A Collection of Hymns and Lullabies at Close of Day

•           2021: Sing! Global (Live at the Getty Music Worship Conference)

See also 
 New Irish Hymns (album series)

References

External links 
 Official Getty Music Website
 Joy – An Irish Christmas Tour Homepage
 Advent and Christmas Songs by Keith Getty, in Reformed Worship
 Article from Calvin College
 "Singable Doctrine", an interview with the Gettys by Stan Guthrie:
 Review of In Christ Alone album in Christianity Today by Andree Farias
 "The Story Behind the Song 'In Christ Alone'" article in Christianity Today by Linda Owen
 Southern Baptist Theological Seminary topical index of Getty/Townend hymns

British performers of Christian music
Evangelicals from Northern Ireland
Performers of contemporary worship music
Christian hymnwriters
Living people
1974 births
People educated at Friends' School, Lisburn
Folk singers from Northern Ireland
20th-century male singers from Northern Ireland
21st-century male singers from Northern Ireland
Officers of the Order of the British Empire
Calvinist and Reformed Christians
Alumni of St Chad's College, Durham